The medal “100th Anniversary of the Diplomatic Service of the Republic of Azerbaijan (1919-2019)” is a state award of the Republic of Azerbaijan. It was established by law #1533-VQD of the Republic dated March 29, 2019. The medal is dedicated to the 100th Anniversary of the Diplomatic Service.

History 
On 16 February 2019, amendments to the Law "On Establishment of Orders and Medals of the Republic of Azerbaijan" were discussed at the meeting of National Assembly. The new medal “100th Anniversary of the Diplomatic Service of the Republic of Azerbaijan (1919-2019)” has been added to the list of medals.

Awarding 
The following persons will be awarded this medal:

 Employees fulfilling of their duties and receiving high results in the diplomatic service agencies,
 Persons performing administrative and technical service of diplomatic service agencies, 
 Veterans of diplomatic agencies,
 Other persons who are actively involved in the development of diplomatic and international relations of Azerbaijan

Recipients 
General Zubair Mahmood Hayat - Chairman, Joint Chief of Staff (Pakistan) (2016 - 2019)

References 

Awards established in 2019
Orders, decorations, and medals of Azerbaijan
2019 establishments in Azerbaijan